Paloč is a village in the municipality of Gornji Vakuf, Bosnia and Herzegovina.

Demographics 
According to the 2013 census, its population was 351.

See also
 Duša killings

References

Populated places in Gornji Vakuf-Uskoplje